Dru World Order is the third studio album by American R&B group Dru Hill, released in late 2002 (see 2002 in music) on Def Jam Recordings' Def Soul imprint. Four years had passed between this release and the group's previous album, Enter the Dru, during which time the quartet imploded, yet later reformed. Beginning with this release, Dru Hill became a quintet, with fifth member Scola (Rufus Waller) added to the original lineup of Sisqó, Jazz, Nokio and Woody. This was the first time that Dru Hill was featured as five members. The album released three singles "I Should Be...", "I Love You" and "No Doubt". Two of the singles had music videos released. This is the group's last album for the entire Def Jam roster and they were released from their contract within a year due to poor album sales for this album and Sisqó's second album, which caused the group to go on a second hiatus.

Background
Following the release of Enter The Dru'''s final single, "You Are Everything", in Summer 1999, Dru Hill was reduced to a trio when Woody left the act to become a gospel singer. During this period, the group's label, Island Records, was merged with Def Jam, and Dru Hill was reassigned to Def Jam's new R&B imprint, Def Soul. The new label renegotiated the group's contracts and successfully returned Woody to the fold. The intended plan was for each member to record a solo album, and then regroup in a year to record Dru World Order. However, lead singer Sisqó's solo album, Unleash the Dragon, was a notable success, selling, at four million copies, twice as much as Enter the Dru. The other three members' solo projects were pushed back as Sisqó singles such as "Thong Song" and "Incomplete" became Top 5 hits on the Billboard Hot 100. When the group reformed in November 2000, it imploded, and Dru Hill was placed on an indefinite hiatus.

One completed recording from the aborted fall 2000 sessions, "Without You", was included on Sisqó's second solo album, Return of Dragon. Unlike Unleash the Dragon, Return of Dragon was not a success. After the group members reunited at the funeral of Woody's mother, Dru Hill made plans to reform. Woody, who had released his solo gospel album on Kirk Franklin's Gospocentric Records in spring 2002, agreed to the reunion, as did Jazz. Dru Hill also hired Rufus "Ruscola" Waller, a local artist from their hometown of Baltimore, Maryland, as a fifth member.

Overview
Initially, Def Soul was not sold on a Dru Hill reunion, given the long period of time since the group's last release, and the relative failure of Sisqó's second solo album. The group won the label over with "I Should Be...", a song written by a teenaged local R&B act from Baltimore called "Everidae" (The Featherstones) along with Jeriel Askew. The new five-man Dru Hill lineup set about recording Dru World Order'' in October 2001, with Nokio taking creative control of the project. 

"I Should Be" peaked at number 25 on the Billboard Hot 100 pop singles chart in the United States, and number six on the Billboard Hot R&B/Hip-Hop Singles & Tracks chart. Its follow-up, "I Love You", was less successful, peaking at number 77 pop and number 21 R&B spring 2003. The album itself peaked at number 21 on the Billboard 200 albums chart, and at number 2 on the Billboard R&B/Hip-Hop Albums chart seeling 122,000 copies in its first week. The album was certified gold by the RIAA for shipments in excess of 500,000 copies.

Track listing

 1 "I Do (Millions)" interpolates the composition "Millions", written by Marvin Winans.

Personnel
Unless Otherwise Indicated, information is taken from Liner Notes and Discogs.com
Lead and background vocals – Sisqó (Mark Andrews), Jazz (Larry Anthony), Nokio (Tamir Ruffin), Scola (Rufus Waller) and Woody (James Green)
Guest vocals – Chinky of LovHer (Lead & Background on track 8), Kwamé (track 5), N.O.R.E. (6)
Additional background vocals – Darrell "Dezo" Adams (track 1), Jessica Rivera (6), J. Moss (7), Eritza Laues (8), Jazz Dru-Daddy (11)
Vocal arrangements – Nokio (track 8), Jazz, Phil Weatherspoon (8), Alan Floyd
Vocal production – Bryan Michael Cox, Tamara Savage, Sisqó
Bass Guitar – Darryl Pearson (track 8)
Guitars – Darryl Pearson (track 2), Billy "Spaceman" Patterson (Lead on 8) 
Piano, Organ, Drums – Nocko (track 12)
Keyboards – Jeriel "Baby J" Askew, Nathan "Boy Genius" Mooring, Darryl Pearson (track 2), Kenya "Fame Flames" Miller, Kwamé, Wirlie Morris, Nocko
Drum Machine – Jeriel "Baby J" Askew, Nathan "Boy Genius" Mooring, Darryl Pearson, Kenya "Fame Flames" Miller, Kwamé, Wirlie Morris
Music Programming - Jeriel "Baby J" Askew (Instruments on track 3), Nocko (tracks 8, 12)
Multiple Instruments - Nathan "Boy Genius" Mooring (track 3), Kwamé Holland (5), Wirlie Morris (11)
String arrangements and conducting – Benjamin Wright (tracks 2, 10), Clare Fischer (8)
Arranging – Guy Roche, Sisqó
Strings  – Assa Drori (Violin on track 8), Antoly Rosinsky (Violin on 8), Elizabeth Wilson (Violin on 8), Igor Kiskatch (Violin on 8), Amy Hershberger (Violin on 8), Julie Rogers (Violin on 8), Jerry Epstein (Viola on 8), John Hayhurst (Viola on 8), Cecilia Tsan (Cello on 8), Richard Treat (Cello on 8), Arni Egilsson (Double Bass on 8)
Recording engineers – Serban Ghenea (tracks 1–2, 8), John Gordon (1-3, 5–6, 8, 10, 12–13), John Hanes (Additional Pro-Tools on 1–2, 6, 8–12), Jan Fairchild (2, 5, 13, Strings on 2 & 10, Vocals on 7), Reggie Dozier (3), Chris Young, Eric "Ebo" Butler (5), Ann Mincieli, Tom Soares (6, 8), Kevin Blott (Instruments on 7), PAJAM (Instruments on 7), Pat Viala (8), Larry Mah (8), Greg Smith (9), Nocko (12, Vocals & Other Instruments on 10), Robert "Tkae" Mendez
Audio Mixing – Serban Ghenea (tracks 1–2, 8–12), Manny Marroquin (3, 5, 7, 13), Tim Roberts (1-2, 6, 8–12), Stephen George (5), Rabeka Tunei (7)
Production Coordinator – Sandra Campbell ("My Angel/How Could You")
Mastering – Chris Gehringer
A&R direction – Nokio, Sisqó, Jaha Johnson
A&R manager – Leesa D. Brunson
A&R coordinator – Tara Podolsky
Recording administration – Terese Joseph
Product consultant – Delroy Morgan
Art direction and design – Akisia Grigsby, Robert Sims
Photography – Anthony Mandler
Stylist – April Roomet

Charts

Weekly charts

Year-end charts

Certifications

References

2002 albums
Dru Hill albums
Albums produced by Bryan-Michael Cox
Albums produced by Warryn Campbell